The 2011 Israeli Basketball League Cup was the 6th edition of the Israeli Basketball League Cup pre-season tournament. It was played between October 9 and October 13 at Malha Arena in Jerusalem. Maccabi Tel Aviv has won the cup after beating Hapoel Holon 78-74 in the final.
MVP was Lior Eliyahu (Maccabi Tel Aviv).

Tournament Bracket
The teams were seeded according to their last season standings.

External links
 Chance Cup

2011
2011–12 in Israeli basketball